2797 Teucer  is a large Jupiter trojan from the Greek camp, approximately  in diameter. It was discovered on 4 June 1981, by American astronomer Edward Bowell at the Anderson Mesa Station near Flagstaff, Arizona, in the United States. The dark D-type asteroid belongs to the 20 largest Jupiter trojans and has a rotation period of 10.15 hours. It was named after the Greek hero and great archer, Teucer.

Orbit and classification 

Teucer is a dark Jovian asteroid orbiting in the leading Greek camp at Jupiter's  Lagrangian point, 60° ahead of its orbit in a 1:1 resonance . It is also a non-family asteroid in the Jovian background population.

It orbits the Sun at a distance of 4.7–5.6 AU once every 11 years and 6 months (4,213 days; semi-major axis of 5.1 AU). Its orbit has an eccentricity of 0.09 and an inclination of 22° with respect to the ecliptic.

Naming 

This minor planet was named after the Greek hero Teucer, from Greek mythology. The son of King Telamon was a great archer and half-brother of Ajax, with whom he fought alongside in the Trojan War. The official naming citation was published by the Minor Planet Center on 17 February 1984.

Physical characteristics 

Teucer has been characterized as a dark D-type asteroid by Pan-STARRS' survey as well as in the SDSS-based taxonomy. It is also an assumed C-type asteroid.

Rotation period 

Several rotational lightcurves of Teucer have been obtained from photometric observations since 1992. Analysis of the best-rated lightcurve from September 2010, by Daniel Coley at the Center for Solar System Studies  gave a well-defined rotation period of  hours with a brightness amplitude of 0.20 magnitude.

Diameter and albedo 

According to the surveys carried out by the Infrared Astronomical Satellite IRAS, the Japanese Akari satellite and the NEOWISE mission of NASA's Wide-field Infrared Survey Explorer, Teucer measures between 89.43 and 113.99 kilometers in diameter and its surface has an albedo between 0.059 and 0.073.

The Collaborative Asteroid Lightcurve Link derives an albedo of 0.0435 and a diameter of 110.72 kilometers based on an absolute magnitude of 8.8.

Notes

References

External links 
 Asteroid Lightcurve Database (LCDB), query form (info )
 Dictionary of Minor Planet Names, Google books
 Asteroids and comets rotation curves, CdR – Observatoire de Genève, Raoul Behrend
 Discovery Circumstances: Numbered Minor Planets (1)-(5000) – Minor Planet Center
 
 

002797
Discoveries by Edward L. G. Bowell
Named minor planets
19810604